Yuval Pugach (Hebrew: יובל פוגאץ'; born 15 November 2001) is an Israeli badminton player. 

She was the women's doubles champion at the 2015 Hatzor International, also won the National Championships titles partnered with Alina Pugach in 2016 and 2017. At the 2022 Maccabiah Games, she won a gold medal in mixed doubles and a silver medal in women's doubles.

Achievements

BWF International Challenge/Series (1 title, 1 runner-up) 
Women's doubles

  BWF International Challenge tournament
  BWF International Series tournament
  BWF Future Series tournament

References

External links 
 

2001 births
Living people
Competitors at the 2022 Maccabiah Games
Israeli female badminton players
Maccabiah Games gold medalists for Israel
Maccabiah Games medalists in badminton
21st-century Israeli women